Karasakız is a Turkish red wine grape variety grown in the Thrace region. It is known as Kuntra in Bozcaada. It has been used in cognac production for a long time. Recently, it is used as a wine grape variety by making both varietal and blending with other grape varieties. In Bozcaada, it is often blended with Karalahna grape variety.

Viticulture 
Karasakız is an early ripening grape variety that ripens in the first week of September. Berries are thin-skinned large and round.

Winemaking 
Karasakız wines are often bottled as varietal; It has medium-low acidity, medium body, low tannins and high alcohol. Generally wines made from Karasakız are not suitable for aging. However, some specialized producer in Thrace have recently made examples that can be aged. Especially in Bozcaada and Thrace, remarkable wines come from old Kuntra vineyards, which are about 70 years old.

References 

Grape varieties of Turkey
Red wine grape varieties